Amer Duka (born 21 January 1999) is an Albanian professional footballer who plays as a centre-back for Albanian club KF Korabi Peshkopi.

Club career

Laçi

International career
He received his first call up for the Albania under-20 side by same coach of the under-21 team Alban Bushi for the friendly match against Georgia U20 on 14 November 2017. He debuted for under-20 team against Georgia coming on as a substitute in the 55th minute for Leonardo Maloku in an eventual 3–0 loss.

Career statistics

Club

References

1999 births
Living people
People from Shijak
Association football defenders
Albanian footballers
Albanian expatriate footballers
Albania youth international footballers
Albania under-21 international footballers
Akademia e Futbollit players
KF Laçi players
KF Erzeni players
KF Teuta Durrës players
Luftëtari Gjirokastër players
KF Skënderbeu Korçë players
KS Kastrioti players
KF Korabi Peshkopi players
Kategoria Superiore players
Albanian expatriate sportspeople in Kosovo
Expatriate footballers in Kosovo